The compound of twenty octahedra is a uniform polyhedron compound. It's composed of a symmetric arrangement of 20 octahedra (considered as triangular antiprisms). It is a special case of the compound of 20 octahedra with rotational freedom, in which pairs of octahedral vertices coincide.

Related polyhedra 

This compound shares its edge arrangement with the great dirhombicosidodecahedron, the great disnub dirhombidodecahedron, and the compound of twenty tetrahemihexahedra.

It may be constructed as the exclusive or of the two enantiomorphs of the great snub dodecicosidodecahedron.

See also
Compound of three octahedra
Compound of four octahedra
Compound of five octahedra
Compound of ten octahedra

References 
.

Polyhedral compounds